Taiasina Tuifua (born 20 August 1984) is a Samoan rugby union player who currently plays for Grenoble in the Top 14 in France. His usual position is either at number 8 or at lock. He has won 19 caps at international level for Samoa played at the 2011 Rugby World Cup.

Tuifua was born in Samoa, but moved to New Zealand in 2002 on a rugby scholarship to Auckland Grammar School.

References

External links

1984 births
Living people
Samoan rugby union players
Samoa international rugby union players
Samoan expatriate rugby union players
Expatriate rugby union players in England
Expatriate rugby union players in France
Samoan expatriate sportspeople in England
Samoan expatriate sportspeople in France
Newcastle Falcons players
Counties Manukau rugby union players
Taranaki rugby union players
Chiefs (rugby union) players
Union Bordeaux Bègles players
People educated at Auckland Grammar School
Rugby union number eights
Rugby union locks
FC Grenoble players
Lyon OU players